Mauritians (singular Mauritian; ; Creole: Morisien) are nationals or natives of the Republic of Mauritius and their descendants. Mauritius is a multi-ethnic society, with notable groups of people of South Asian (notably Indian), Sub-Saharan African (Mauritian Creoles), European (European Mauritians), and Chinese descent, as well those of a mixed background from any combination of the aforementioned ethnic groups.

History
Mauritian Creoles trace their origins to the plantation owners and people who were captured via the slave trade and brought to work the sugar fields. Plantation owners were predominantly of European ancestry while the enslaved people mostly had ancestry from continental Africa.

When slavery was abolished on 1 February 1835, an attempt was made to secure a cheap source of adaptable labour for intensive sugar plantations in Mauritius. Indentured labour began with Indian, Chinese, Malay, African and Malagasy labourers, but ultimately, it was India which supplied the much needed labourers to Mauritius, mainly sugar cane workers.  This period of intensive use of Indian labour took place during British rule, with many brutal episodes and a long struggle by the indentured for respect. The term applied to the indentured during this period, and which has since become a derogatory term for Mauritians of Asian descent, was coolie. The island soon became the key-point in the trade of indentured labourers, as thousands of Indians set forth from Calcutta or Karikal; not only did they modify the social, political and economic physiognomies of the island, but some also went farther, to the West Indies.

Indo-Mauritians are descended from Indian immigrants who arrived in the 19th century via the Aapravasi Ghat in order to work as indentured labourers after slavery was abolished in 1835. Included in the Indo-Mauritian community are Hindus (48.5% of the Mauritian population) and Muslims (17.2%) from the Indian subcontinent (figures are from 2011). Christians make up 28% of the population   and this figure corresponds to the size of the Mauritian Creole population which is predominantly Christian. The Franco-Mauritian elite controlled nearly all of the large sugar estates and was active in business and banking. As the Indian population became numerically dominant after independence from British rule and the voting franchise was extended, political and economic power shifted from the Franco-Mauritians and their Creole allies to the Indo-Mauritians.

The meeting of a mosaic of people from Europe, India, Africa and China began a process of hybridisation and intercultural frictions and dialogues, which poet Khal Torabully has termed "coolitude". This social reality is a major reference for identity opened to otherness and is widely used in Mauritius where it represents a humanism of diversity.

Subsequent to a Constitutional amendment in 1982, there is no need for Mauritians to reveal their ethnic identities for the purpose of population census. Official statistics on ethnicity are not available. The 1972 census was the last one to measure ethnicity. Statistics Mauritius compiles data on religious affiliation every ten years during census.

Demographics of Mauritius

Mauritian diaspora

The Mauritian diaspora consists of Mauritian emigrants and their descendants in various countries around the world, mainly France, Great Britain (United Kingdom), Australia, New Zealand, Canada, Ireland and Belgium.

Given the island's importance for international shipping routes and limited opportunities locally, Mauritian Creole people settled internationally before some of these countries were founded as nations. For example, Mauritians settled on the continent of Australia before federation of the nation. Their ancestors and more recent migrants are now known as Mauritian Australians. Aboriginal people from islands south of the continent likewise settled in Australia.

See also

 Demographics of Mauritius
 List of Mauritians

References